Lieven Malfait (born 18 June 1952) is a Belgian racing cyclist. He rode in the 1979 Tour de France.

References

1952 births
Living people
Belgian male cyclists
Place of birth missing (living people)